Jal-e Chala Sar (also Romanized as Jal-e Chalā Sar) is a village in Goli Jan Rural District, in the Central District of Tonekabon County, Mazandaran Province, Iran. At the 2006 census, its population was 260, in 71 families.

References 

Populated places in Tonekabon County